Fukunohana Koichi (born 1 July 1940 as Koichi Fukushima) is a former sumo wrestler from Kōshi, Kumamoto, Japan. He made his professional debut in  January 1958 and reached the top division in September 1965. His highest rank was sekiwake. He retired in November 1975.

He had been scheduled to fight Kashiwado in July 1969 and Taihō in May 1971, but on both occasions received a fusensho or win by default because the yokozuna both announced their retirements. Fukunohana had never beaten Taihō in the ring, losing to him ten straight times.

He made his only appearance at sekiwake in January 1971, by which time he was already over 30, unusually old for a sekiwake debut at that time. He was three times a tournament runner-up, earned seven special prizes for Fighting Spirit and five gold stars for defeating yokozuna.

In January 1970 he knocked out ōzeki Kitanofuji with a harite or strike with the open hand, a legitimate sumo move, and acquired the nickname "flower of the hook," a play on his shikona Fukunohana. 

He became a mentor to Mienoumi, who was a fellow member of Dewanoumi stable, and said that he would not retire until Mienoumi reached the rank of ōzeki. After six straight make-koshi or losing scores in the top division, he announced his retirement after the November 1975 tournament, when Mienoumi's promotion to ōzeki was confirmed.

He became an elder of the Japan Sumo Association under the name Sekinoto, working as a coach at Dewanoumi stable. His wife was the daughter of a previous owner of the Sekinoto elder name, former komusubi Wakashima. He became a special executive in 2000. He left the Sumo Association in 2005 upon turning 65 years of age.

From 2009 until 2011 a junior wrestler at Dewanoumi stable, whose real name was Fukumoto, was given permission to use the Fukunohana shikona.

Career record

See also
List of sumo tournament top division runners-up
Glossary of sumo terms
List of past sumo wrestlers
List of sekiwake

References

1940 births
Living people
Japanese sumo wrestlers
Sumo people from Kumamoto Prefecture
Sekiwake